Bač is a village and a former municipality in the southern part of North Macedonia. By the 2003 territorial division of the country, the rural municipality of Bač was attached to Novaci Municipality.

Demographics
According to the 2002 census, the village had a total of 172 inhabitants. Ethnic groups in the village include:

Macedonians 171
Serbs 1

References

External links
Bač (Municipality, North Macedonia)

Villages in Novaci Municipality